Garden of the Gods (Arapaho: Ho3o’uu Niitko’usi’i) is a 1,341.3 acre public park located in Colorado Springs, Colorado, United States. 862 acres of the park was designated a National Natural Landmark in 1971.

Name 

The area now known as Garden of the Gods was first called Red Rock Corral by the Europeans. Then, in August 1859, two surveyors who helped to set up Colorado City explored the site. One of the surveyors, Melancthon S. Beach suggested it would be a "capital place for a beer garden".  His companion, the young Rufus Cable, awestruck by the impressive rock formations, exclaimed, "Beer Garden! Why, it is a fit place for the Gods to assemble. We will call it the Garden of the Gods.",
The April 5, 1893 issue of the Colorado Transcript reported, "It was Helen Hunt Jackson, it is said, who named 'the Garden of the Gods' in Colorado. Riding past the cabin of a prospector from the South in one of the early days of the settlement, she was attracted by a beautifully kept garden in which two negro servants, a man and a woman, were working. In answer to a question the man informed her that his name was Jupiter, and the woman's Juno, whereupon she exclaimed, 'Then this must be the Garden of the Gods.'"

The name "Garden of the Gods" was also later given to a section of the Iverson Movie Ranch in Chatsworth, Calif., filled with large sandstone rock formations, because of the area's resemblance to Colorado's Garden of the Gods. The story goes that back in the early days of Hollywood, a movie producer seeking a rocky filming location made a comment to the effect of, "Who needs to go all the way to Colorado -- we have our own 'Garden of the Gods' here!" The Iverson family took the comment to heart and began calling their own collection of rock formations the "Garden of the Gods," and the name stuck. Today the main section of Chatsworth's Garden of the Gods has also been preserved as a park.

History 

The garden's red rock formations were created during a geological upheaval along a natural fault line millions of years ago. Archaeological evidence shows that prehistoric people visited Garden of the Gods about 1330 BC. At about 250 BC, Native American people camped in the park; they are believed to have been attracted to wildlife and plant life in the area and used overhangs created by the rocks for shelter. Many native peoples have reported a connection to Garden of the Gods, including Apache, Cheyenne, Comanche, Kiowa, Lakota, Pawnee, Shoshone, and Ute people.

Multiple American Indian Nations traveled through Garden of the Gods. The Utes' oral traditions tell of their creation at the Garden of the Gods, and petroglyphs have been found in the park that are typical of early Utes. The Utes found red rocks to have a spiritual connection and camped near Manitou Springs and the creek near Rock Ledge Ranch bordering Garden of the Gods. The Old Ute Trail went past Garden of the Gods to Ute Pass and led later explorers through Manitou Springs. Starting in the 16th century, Spanish explorers and later European American explorers and trappers traveled through the area, including Lt. John C. Frémont and Lt. George Frederick Ruxton, who recorded their visits in their journals.

In 1879, Charles Elliott Perkins, a friend of William Jackson Palmer, purchased 480 acres of land that included a portion of the present Garden of the Gods. Upon Perkins' death, his family gave the land to the City of Colorado Springs in 1909, with the provision that it would be a free public park. Palmer had owned the Rock Ledge Ranch and upon his death it was donated to the city.

Helen Hunt Jackson wrote of the park, "You wind among rocks of every conceivable and inconceivable shape and size... all bright red, all motionless and silent, with a strange look of having been just stopped and held back in the very climax of some supernatural catastrophe."

In 1995, the Garden of the Gods Visitor and Nature Center was opened just outside the park.

Geological formations 

The outstanding geologic features of the park, including Steamboat Rock, the Three Graces, and Balanced Rock, are the ancient sedimentary beds of deep-red, pink and white sandstones, conglomerates and limestone that were deposited horizontally, but have now been tilted vertically and faulted into "fins" by the immense mountain building forces caused by the uplift of the Rocky Mountains and the Pikes Peak massif. The following Pleistocene Ice Age resulted in erosion and glaciation of the rock, creating the present rock formations. Evidence of past ages can be read in the rocks: ancient seas, eroded remains of ancestral mountain ranges, alluvial fans, sandy beaches and great sand dune fields.

Ecology 
The Garden of the Gods Park is a rich ecological resource. Retired biology professor Richard Beidleman notes that the park is "the most striking contrast between plains and mountains in North America" with respect to biology, geology, climate, and scenery. The skull of a dinosaur was found in the park in 1878, and was identified as a unique species, Theiophytalia kerri, in 2006. A subspecies of honey ant not previously recorded was also discovered in 1879 and named after the park. Mule deer, bighorn sheep and fox are common. The park is also home to more than 130 species of birds including white-throated swifts, swallows and canyon wrens.

Recreation 

The Garden of the Gods Park is popular for hiking, technical rock climbing, road and mountain biking and horseback riding. It attracts more than two million visitors a year, making it the city's most visited park. There are 21 miles of trails. Annual events including summer running races, recreational bike rides and Pro Cycling Challenge Prologue also take place in this park.

The main trail in the park, the 1.5-mile Perkins Central Garden Trail, is paved and wheelchair-accessible, running "through the heart of the park's largest and most scenic red rocks". The trail begins at the North Parking lot, the main parking lot off of Juniper Way Loop.

Because of the unusual and steep rock formations in the park, it is an attractive destination for rock climbers.  Rock climbing is permitted, with annual permits obtained at the City of Colorado Springs' website. Climbers are required to follow the "Technical Climbing Regulations and Guidelines", which includes using proper equipment, climbing in parties of two or more, and a ban on staining chalks. Precipitation makes rocks unstable and therefore climbing is not allowed when the rocks are wet or icy. There are fines for unregistered climbers and possibly rescue costs. Several fatalities have occurred over the years, often when unlawful climbers fail to use proper safety equipment,  or, more rarely, when a lawful climber falls due to equipment failure or user error.

Visitor and nature center 
The Garden of the Gods Visitor and Nature Center is located at 1805 N. 30th Street and offers a view of the park. The center's information center and 30 educational exhibits are staffed by Parks, Recreation and Culture employees of the City of Colorado Springs. A short movie, How Did Those Red Rocks Get There?, runs every 20 minutes.  A portion of the proceeds from the center's privately owned store and cafe support the non-profit Garden of the Gods Foundation; the money is used for maintenance and improvements to the park.

Natural history exhibits include minerals, geology, plants and local wildlife, as well as Native Americans who visited the park. Programs include nature hikes and talks, a Junior Ranger program, narrated bus tours, movies, educational programs and special programs.

Hours and admission
Both the Garden of the Gods Park and the Visitor and Nature Center are free to the public. Park hours are 5:00a.m. to 10:00p.m. from May1 to October31, and 5:00a.m. to 9:00p.m. from November1 to April30. The Visitor and Nature Center is open from 9:00a.m. to 6:00p.m. from Memorial Day weekend to Labor Day weekend, and from 9:00a.m. to 5:00p.m. the rest of the year.

Designations 
 National Natural Landmark in 1971
 Great American Public Place of 2011 by the American Planning Association. The Great American Places are defined by many criteria, including architectural features, accessibility, functionality and community involvement.

Gallery

See also
 Garden of the Gods Trading Post, adjacent to south side of the Garden of the Gods Park
 Rock Ledge Ranch Historic Site, immediately adjacent to Garden of the Gods

References

Further reading

External links 

Official website
Media related to Garden of the Gods at the Library of Congress

Fountain Formation
Rock formations of Colorado
Tourist attractions in Colorado Springs, Colorado
Natural history of Colorado
National Natural Landmarks in Colorado
Nature centers in Colorado
Museums in Colorado Springs, Colorado
Natural history museums in Colorado
Geologic formations with imbedded sand dunes
Climbing areas of Colorado
Parks in Colorado Springs, Colorado
Landforms of El Paso County, Colorado
1909 establishments in Colorado
Protected areas established in 1909